The state agencies that form Thailand's public sector consist of several types of functioning bodies. While some agencies established by mandate of the constitution are independent, others are directly or indirectly answerable to the executive of the Royal Thai Government. The majority of these are government agencies, which employ the civil service as well as the military. Others include public organizations and state enterprises.

Constitutional organizations
In addition to the constituents of the three branches of government, the (now-repealed) 2007 constitution provided for certain regulatory and advisory bodies. For further details, see Constitutional organizations of Thailand.

Agencies under executive regulation
Government agencies under direct control of the ministries are the oldest type of state agency. They date to the establishment of the modern bureaucracy by King Chulalongkorn in the 19th century, while state enterprises were introduced in the first half of the 20th century.

By the 1990s, the bureaucratic structure of government agencies had become recognized as a source of inefficiency, and administrative reforms begun in 1997 sought to ameliorate the issue by creating new forms of state agencies with greater autonomy and operational flexibility. Thailand's state agencies now fall into the following types, as classified by the Office of the Public Sector Development Commission:

Government agencies
State enterprises
Public organizations
New state agency forms
 Independent administrative organizations
 Legal-entity funds
 Service delivery units

Government agencies
Government agencies make up the majority of the machinery of government. They serve the basic functions of government, providing administrative public services, and follow the policies of the executive. Their operation is based on the laws and regulations of the civil service and the military.

Within the central administration, government agencies include the ministries and sub-ministries, and their constituent departments or equivalent agencies. Within the provincial administration, they include the provinces and their districts. Within the local administration, they include the administrative organizations of local governments, including provincial administration organizations, municipalities and subdistrict administration organizations.

State enterprises
State enterprises provide industrial and commercial public services. They exist both as purpose-established organizations (e.g.,  the State Railway of Thailand) and limited companies in which the government is the majority shareholder (e.g., Krung Thai Bank PLC).

Public organizations
Public organizations, also known as autonomous public organizations, were introduced in 1999. They provide social and cultural public services, and operate under supervision of the government, while maintaining a greater degree of administrative independence.

Most newer public organizations are established under the Public Organization Act, B.E. 2542 (1999 CE), the first being Banphaeo Hospital in 2000. Others, such as the National Science and Technology Development Agency, are established by respective acts of parliament, and are also referred to as autonomous agencies. Autonomous universities (as opposed to those that function as government agencies) also fall under this category.

Independent administrative organizations
Independent administrative organizations serve the operations of regulatory bodies (e.g., the Office of the National Broadcasting and Telecommunications Commission) or other public agencies whose independence is in the public interest (e.g., the Thai Public Broadcasting Service).

Legal-entity funds
Legal-entity funds are established by acts of parliament to serve certain economic purposes that are of public benefit.

Service delivery units
Service delivery units were introduced in 2005. They are service-oriented, quasi-autonomous units operating under government departments, but have a more flexible internal management system. Their services are primarily aimed for their mother agency.

List of state agencies of Thailand

Constitutional organizations

Independent organizations
Office of the Election Commission
Office of the Ombudsman
Office of the National Anti-Corruption Commission
Office of the Auditor General
Other organizations
Office of the Attorney General
Office of the National Human Rights Commission
Office of the National Economic and Social Advisory Council

Governmental agencies

 Office of the Prime Minister
 Departments:
 Office of the Permanent Secretary
 Government Public Relations Department
 Office of the Consumer Protection Board
 Departments directly reporting to the prime minister:
 Secretariat of the Prime Minister
 Secretariat of the Cabinet
 National Intelligence Agency
 Bureau of the Budget
 Office of the National Security Council
 Office of the Council of State
 Office of the Civil Service Commission
 Office of the National Economic and Social Development Council
 Office of the Public Sector Development Commission
 Office of the Board of Investment
 Ministry of Defence
 Office of the Minister
 Office of the Permanent Secretary
 Royal Aide-de-Camp Department
 Royal Security Command
 Royal Thai Armed Forces
 Royal Thai Armed Forces Headquarters
 Royal Thai Army
 Royal Thai Navy
 Royal Thai Air Force
 Ministry of Finance
 Office of the Minister
 Office of the Permanent Secretary
 Treasury Department
 Comptroller General's Department
 Customs Department
 Excise Department
 Revenue Department
 State Enterprise Policy Office
 Public Debt Management Office
 Fiscal Policy Office
 Ministry of Foreign Affairs
 Office of the Minister
 Office of the Permanent Secretary
 Department of Consular Affairs
 Department of International Cooperation
 Department of Protocol
 Department of European Affairs
 Department of Technical and Economic Cooperation
 Department of International Economic Affairs
 Department of Treaties and Legal Affairs
 Department of Information
 Department of International Organizations
 Department of American and South Pacific Affairs
 Department of ASEAN Affairs
 Department of East Asian Affairs
 Department of South Asian, Middle East and African Affairs
Ministry of Tourism and Sports
 Office of the Minister
 Office of the Permanent Secretary
 Department of Physical Education
 Department of Tourism
 Ministry of Social Development and Human Security
 Office of the Minister
 Office of the Permanent Secretary
 Department of Social Development and Welfare
 Office of Women's Affairs and Family Development
 National Office for Empowerment of Persons with Disabilities
 Office of Welfare Promotion, Protection and Empowerment of Vulnerable Groups
 Ministry of Agriculture and Cooperatives
 Office of the Minister
 Office of the Permanent Secretary
 Rice Department
 Royal Irrigation Department
 Cooperative Auditing Department
 Department of Fisheries
 Department of Livestock Development
 Department of Royal Rainmaking and Agricultural Aviation
 Land Development Department
 Department of Agriculture
 Department of Agricultural Extension
 Cooperative Promotion Department
 Queen Sirikit Department of Sericulture
 Agricultural Land Reform Office
 National Bureau of Agricultural Commodity and Food Standards
 Office of Agricultural Economics
 Ministry of Transport
 Office of the Minister
 Office of the Permanent Secretary
 Marine Department
 Department of Land Transport
 Department of Airports
 Department of Highways
 Department of Rural Roads
 Office of Transport and Traffic Policy and Planning
 Department of Rail Transport
 Ministry of Natural Resources and Environment
 Office of the Minister
 Office of the Permanent Secretary
 Pollution Control Department
 Department of Marine and Coastal Resources
 Department of Mineral Resources
 Department of Water Resources
 Department of Groundwater Resources
 Royal Forest Department
 Department of Environment Quality Promotion
 Department of National Parks, Wildlife and Plant Conservation
 Office of Natural Resources and Environmental Policy and Planning
 Ministry of Information and Communication Technology
 Office of the Minister
 Office of the Permanent Secretary
 Thai Meteorological Department
 National Statistical Office
 Ministry of Energy
 Office of the Minister
 Office of the Permanent Secretary
 Department of Mineral Fuels
 Department of Energy Business
 Department of Alternative Energy Development and Efficiency
 Energy Policy and Planning Office
 Ministry of Commerce
 Office of the Minister
 Office of the Permanent Secretary
 Department of Foreign Trade
 Department of Internal Trade
 Department of Trade Negotiations
 Department of Intellectual Property
 Department of Business Development
 Department of International Trade Promotion
 Trade Policy and Strategy Office
 Ministry of Interior
 Office of the Minister
 Office of the Permanent Secretary
 Department of Provincial Administration
 Community Development Department
 Department of Lands
 Department of Disaster Prevention and Mitigation
 Department of Public Works and Town & Country Planning 
 Department of Local Administration  
 Ministry of Justice
 Office of the Minister
 Departments:
 Office of the Permanent Secretary
 Department of Probation
 Rights and Liberties Protection Department
 Legal Execution Department
 Department of Juvenile Observation and Protection
 Department of Corrections
 Department of Special Investigation
 Office of Justice Affairs
 Central Institute of Forensic Science
 Departments reporting directly to the minister:
 Office of the Narcotics Control Board
 Ministry of Labour
 Office of the Minister
 Office of the Permanent Secretary
 Department of Employment
 Department of Skill Development
 Department of Labour Protection and Welfare
 Social Security Office
 Ministry of Culture
 Office of the Minister
 Office of the Permanent Secretary
 Religious Affairs Department
 Fine Arts Department
 Department of Cultural Promotion
 Office of Contemporary Art and Culture
 Ministry of Higher Education, Science, Research and Innovation
 Office of the Minister
 Office of the Permanent Secretary
 Department of Science Service
 Office of Atoms for Peace
 Office of the Higher Education Commission
 Office of the National Research Council of Thailand
 Ministry of Education
 Office of the Minister
 Office of the Permanent Secretary
 Office of the Education Council
 Office of the Basic Education Commission
 Office of the Vocational Education Commission
 Ministry of Public Health
 Office of the Minister
 Office of the Permanent Secretary
 Department of Medical Services
 Department of Disease Control
 Department for Development of Thai Traditional and Alternative Medicine
 Department of Medical Sciences
 Department of Health Service Support
 Department of Mental Health
 Department of Health
 Food and Drug Administration
 Ministry of Industry
 Office of the Minister
 Office of the Permanent Secretary
 Department of Industrial Works
 Department of Industrial Promotion
 Department of Primary Industries and Mines
 Office of the Cane and Sugar Board
 Thai Industrial Standards Institute
 Office of Industrial Economics
 Departments independent of ministries:
 National Office of Buddhism
 Office of the Royal Development Projects Board
 Royal Institute
 Royal Thai Police
 Anti-Money Laundering Office

State enterprises

Public organizations
Public organizations established under the Public Organizations Act

 Community Organizations Development Institute
 Mahidol Wittayanusorn School
 Banphaeo Hospital
 Geo-Informatics and Space Technology Development Agency
 The Office for National Education Standards and Quality Assessment
 Princess Maha Chakri Sirindhorn Anthropology Centre
 The International Institute for Trade and Development
 Thailand Convention and Exhibition Bureau
 Agricultural Research Development Agency
 The Energy Fund Administration Institute
 Designated Areas for Sustainable Tourism Administration
 Software Industry Promotion Agency
 The SUPPORT Arts and Crafts International Centre of Thailand
 The Gem and Jewelry Institute of Thailand
 Office of Knowledge Management and Development
 Neighbouring Countries Economic Development Cooperation Agency
 National Institute of Educational Testing Service
 Highland Research and Development Institute
 Thailand Institute of Nuclear Technology
 Thailand Greenhouse Gas Management Organization
 Biodiversity-based Economy Development Office
 Synchrotron Light Research Institute
 Hydro and Agro Informatics Institute
 National Astronomical Research Institute of Thailand
 Defence Technology Institute
 The Golden Jubilee Museum of Agriculture Office
 The Healthcare Accreditation Institute
 Film Archive
 National Innovation Agency
 Electronic Government Agency
 Electronic Transactions Development Agency
 Thailand Institute of Occupational Safety and Health
 Thailand Professional Qualification Institute
 The Land Bank Administration Institute
 Thailand Center of Excellence for Life Sciences
 Moral Promotion Center
 Thailand Institute of Justice
 National Vaccine Institute
 Pinkanakorn Development Agency

Public organizations established under specific acts

 National Science and Technology Development Agency
 The Thailand Research Fund
 Health Systems Research Institute
 National Institute of Metrology
 Institute for the Promotion of Teaching Science and Technology
 Office of Small and Medium Enterprises Promotion
 Thai Health Promotion Foundation
 National Health Security Office
 Secretariat Office of the Teachers Council of Thailand
 Office of the Welfare Promotion Commission for Teachers and Education Personnel
 National Village and Urban Community Fund Office
 National Health Commission Office
 Thailand Arbitration Center
 National Science Technology and Innovation Policy Office
 National Institute for Emergency Medicine

Independent administrative organizations

 Bank of Thailand
 Office of the Securities and Exchange Commission
 Office of Insurance Commission
 Office of the Energy Regulatory Commission
 Thai Public Broadcasting Service
 Deposit Protection Agency
 Office of the National Broadcasting and Telecommunications Commission
 The Civil Aviation Authority of Thailand
 Office of Trade Competition Commission (OTCC)

Service delivery units
 Institute for Good Governance Promotion
 Cabinet and Royal Gazette Publishing Office

Former state agencies

Royal agencies
In 2017, several government agencies were transferred to the direct control of the king, and ceased to be considered state agencies. They were the Bureau of the Royal Household (previously a ministry-independent department) and its subsidiary the Office of His Majesty's Principal Private Secretary, the Royal Aide de Camp Department and the Royal Guard Command (previously under the Ministry of Defence), and the Royal Court Security Police (previously under the Royal Thai Police).

References

 
Government of Thailand
Thailand